This article focuses on African Americans who were lynched after World War I. After young African-American men volunteered to fight against the Central Powers, during World War I, many of them returned home but instead of being rewarded for their military service, they were subjected to discrimination and racism by the citizens and the government. Labor shortages in essential industries caused a massive migration of southern African- Americans to northern cities leading to a wide-spread emergency of segregation in the north and the regeneration of the Ku Klux Klan. For many African-American veterans, as well as the majority of the African-Americans in the United States, the times which followed the war were fraught with challenges similar to those they faced overseas. Discrimination and segregation were at the forefront of everyday life, but most prevalent in schools, public revenues, and housing. Although members of different races who had fought in World War I believed that military service was a price which was worth paying in exchange for equal citizenship, this was not the case for African Americans. The decades which followed World War I included blatant acts of racism and nationally recognized events which conveyed American society's portrayal of African-Americans as 2nd class citizens. Although the United States had just won The Great War  in 1918, the national fight for equal rights was just beginning.

Background

World War I

World War I began with the assassination of Austrian Archduke Franz Ferdinand on June 28, 1914 and it ended with the signing of the Armistice of November 11, 1918. Though the fighting stopped, the war's potential to resume still existed and peace was only reached when representatives of Germany signed the Treaty of Versailles on June 28, 1919, exactly five years after the assassination of Archduke Franz Ferdinand. On April 2, 1917, President Woodrow Wilson declared war on Germany after Germany resumed its submarine attacks on merchant and passenger ships. When the United States sent men to the fronts of Europe, the United States Armed Forces remained segregated, with all-black and all-white units. Despite the segregation and the mistreatment which they were constantly being subjected to by everyday society, many African Americans volunteered to join the Allied war effort. By the time of the signing of the armistice with Germany, more than 350,000 African Americans had joined the military and served with the American Expeditionary Forces (AEF) on the Western Front. Around 50,000 of those 350,000 experienced combat and a total of 770 African-Americans who fought for their country paid with their lives. On top of that, during the course of World War 1, over 400,000 black citizens who were searching for defense jobs migrated from the rural south to the urban north in order to fill the need for laborers which existed in essential industries. Although this provided new opportunities for many African American, it would go on to encourage widespread segregation and discrimination in the north after the war was over.

Reaction to returning veterans
Historically, when a war is over, those who served are lauded for their heroism and patriotism. However, that has not always been the case for American soldiers of African descent. African American soldiers who served in World War 1 were treated worse before, during, and after the war than any other group of American soldiers.

During a homecoming celebration for African-American veterans of World War I in Norfolk, Virginia a race riot broke out on July 21, 1919. At least two people were killed and three others were injured. City officials had to call in the Marines and Navy personnel to restore order.

On August 16, 1917, Senator James K. Vardaman of Mississippi spoke of his fear of black veterans returning to the South, as he viewed that it would "inevitably lead to disaster." To the American South, the use of black soldiers in the military was a threat, not a virtue. "Impress the negro with the fact that he is defending the flag, inflate his untutored soul with military airs, teach him that it is his duty to keep the emblem of the Nation flying triumphantly in the air," and, the senator cautioned, "it is but a short step to the conclusion that his political rights must be respected."

Often violence broke out between serving members of the military. In both the Bisbee Riot (July 3, 1919) and the New London riots of 1919 active African-American service members were attacked by white mobs or white military units.

Many black soldiers in the years after the war were threatened with violence if they were caught wearing their uniform. Many others were even physically attacked, sometimes barely escaping with their lives. During an April 5, 1919, market day in Sylvester, Georgia, black veteran Daniel Mack was walking through a busy street and brushed against a white man. The white man was offended that Mack did not show the proper amount of respect and the two got in a scuffle; police came on the scene and promptly arrested Mack for assault. He was sentenced to 30 days in prison. A few days into his sentence, on April 14, a white mob broke into the prison, took him out into the wilderness and lynched Mack; he survived by playing dead. No arrests were ever made. Elisha Harper, 25 years old, was the son of the Rev. T. F. Harper, a respectable and "well-behaved preacher" living in Helena. He fought in the army during World War I and just returned from Europe. On July 24, 1919, while walking the streets of Newberry, South Carolina, he allegedly insulted a 14-year-old girl, who promptly reported him to the authorities. Harper was arrested and thrown in jail. Soon a white mob had gathered and would have lynched Harper if it was not for the local Sheriff who hid him away.

Military service provided by African-Americans overseas and at home made little difference in citizenship for African-Americans. American society still perceived African Americans the same after the war as they did before the war.

Lynched African-American veterans 
The following is an incomplete list of African Americans who had served in the military during WWI and were killed by white mobs with no trials for alleged crimes. Lynching is embedded deep in America's racial psyche. By 1919, lynching had developed into a programmatic ritual of torture and empowerment to the white race. The accurate number of African American veterans lynched in military uniform is unknown, but there were several cases of beatings and lynchings for the refusal to remove a military uniform, most notably the lynching of Wilbur Little in the spring of 1919. Apparent from the table, the vast majority of lynchings took place in the southeast region of the United States. The three states with the largest number of African American lynchings from 1850 - 1929 were Georgia, Mississippi and Texas.

Contrast to White Veterans 
The return home was not perfect for any one group of people leading to the development of the Bonus Armys and many other displays of displeasement. A majority of World War I veterans believed that they had not been compensated enough for their service and they should have been taken better care of, especially in hospitals. However, there was still a major contrast in the treatment received from white and black veterans after World War 1, leading to public unrest and loss of life.

White veterans received far more recognition from a national level for their bravery and sacrifice in the war. This included radio appearances, national headlines, and statues honoring their sacrifice. The population of the United states in 1919 was over 85% white and almost all major media organizations were run by white males leading to a disparity in the media attention for the entire African-American population. A monopolized media industry and racial prejudice from white Americans led to the unwillingness to consistently recognize the efforts and sacrifices of African-American veterans. In fact, out of the nearly 400,000 African Americans who served in World War I not one was rewarded with the Congressional Medal of Honor until 1991.

When veterans came back home, there were various victory parades thrown in their honor in major cities. However, because segregation was still in place there were separate parades thrown for African-American soldiers at a smaller scale. During these parades there would be several examples of civil unrest, most notable during a victory parade in Norfolk, Virginia a race riot broke out on July 21, 1919. It was not just notoriety and praise that African-American veterans were lacking. The greatest gap between white and black veterans could be seen when examining financial stability and socioeconomic status. On average, white Americans had far more resources and privileges to live at a higher quality of life.

Aftermath

These lynchings were among several incidents of civil unrest that are now known as the American Red Summer of 1919. Attacks on black communities and white oppression spread to more than three dozen cities and counties. In most cases, white mobs attacked African American neighborhoods. In some cases, black community groups resisted the attacks, especially in Chicago and Washington, D.C. Most deaths occurred in rural areas during events like the Elaine massacre in Arkansas, where an estimated 100 to 240 blacks and 5 whites were killed. Other major events of Red Summer were the Chicago race riot and Washington D.C. race riot, which caused 38 and 39 deaths, respectively. Both riots had many more non-fatal injuries and extensive property damage reaching up into the millions of dollars.

African-Americans were not only plagued with racism upon return but the rising flu pandemic of 1918 as well. Due to the statically lower socioeconomic status held by many African-Americans they were more likely to contract the flu and once contracted they were worse off fighting it. Therefore, the flu pandemic devastated the African- American community and left their overall health and financial well being in shambles. This would then cause African American World War 1 veterans to communicate directly with policymakers and bureaucrats to push professional and public health advancement in the 1920s and 1930s for all black Americans.

Prior to World War I, most African Americans did not challenge the racial status quo. However, these events and unequal treatment following World War I did lead to a spark in the African American community. Following the war, emboldened by their military service and their support of the war at home through defense jobs, African Americans were determined to fight for equality. Racism and segregation are issues which plagued the African-American community for too long and they were now willing to fight against it. In fact, during the war the African American community hosted protests against segregation and discrimination, but lacked the ignition to cause real change. This change would be called the "New Negro Movement" and could be described as the radical political movement toward civil rights following World War I. Emphasized in W. E. B. Du Bois's May 1919 Crisis editorial, "Returning Soldiers," in which he famously proclaimed, "We return. We return from fighting. We return fighting." . The combination of the New Negro Movement and the Harlem Renaissance allowed African American intellectuals to secure social equality through literature. This allowed major groups, such as the NAACP, to lobby for bills which pursued equality for African Americans. Most notable was the Dyer Anti-Lynching Bill, intended to prevent lynchings in the United States, but did not pass.

Although, post World War 1 could be defined as the spark that initiated the fight against the status quo and the emergence of the New Negro Movement. The fight for equality and civil rights in the United States would become a centuries-long battle which is still taking place today. Due to this reason, similar racial violence and lynchings occurred again after African-American troops returned from service in World War 2 and African American veterans of the Cold War

See also

Mass racial violence in the United States
List of lynching victims in the United States
List of incidents of civil unrest in the United States

Bibliography
Notes

References

 – Total pages: 336

 – Total pages: 386

 – Total pages: 472

 
 

1918 in military history
1918 murders in the United States
1919 in military history
1919 murders in the United States
African-American history between emancipation and the civil rights movement
 
Aftermath of World War I in the United States
Death in the United States-related lists
History of racism in the United States
20th-century history of the United States Army
Legal history of the United States
Lists of African-American people
Lynching deaths in the United States

Red Summer
Veterans' affairs in the United States
White American riots in the United States